Fitzmaurice is an unincorporated area in the rural municipality of Garry No. 245, in the Canadian province of Saskatchewan. Fitzmaurice is located North of  Highway 52 & West of Highway 617 in eastern Saskatchewan.

See also
List of communities in Saskatchewan
List of rural municipalities in Saskatchewan

Ghost towns in Saskatchewan
Garry No. 245, Saskatchewan
Unincorporated communities in Saskatchewan
Division No. 9, Saskatchewan